"My Salsa" is a song by the French rapper Franglish featuring Canadian rapper Tory Lanez released in 2020.

Charts

Weekly charts

Year-end charts

References

2020 songs
2020 singles
French songs
English-language French songs
Songs about dancing